The Chesapeake and Ohio Railway's class L-2 comprised eight coal-fired 4-6-4 "Hudson" type steam locomotives numbered 300–307 and built by the Baldwin Locomotive Works of Philadelphia, Pennsylvania in 1941. They had roller bearings on all axles, and the first-built, No. 300, had roller bearings on its side and main rods too. No. 300 also bore "Elephant ear" smoke deflectors from 1948.

In 1947, the C&O ordered five additional and very similar locomotives, numbering them 310–314; these were class L-2-A and differed mostly in using Franklin RC poppet valves instead of the Baker valve gear of the L-2s. These were the last express passenger steam locomotives ordered by a United States railroad, and some of the most expensive at $353,346 each, 80% more than the cost of the 8 earlier L-2 locomotives.

Both classes were among the largest 4-6-4s ever built, and they were even more powerful than the C&O's L-1 class. They were intended to work the C&O's top-flight express trains on level ground; the railroad purchased 4-8-4 "Greenbrier" types for mountain service.

By 1953, C&O passenger services were wholly dieselized, and there was no more work for these locomotives to do. Hudson locomotives were very unsuited to freight work, with such a comparatively small proportion of their weight on the drivers. All the L2’s and L2a’s were quickly scrapped by 1953.

Notes
  

4-6-4 locomotives
L-2
Baldwin locomotives
Railway locomotives introduced in 1941
Steam locomotives of the United States
Scrapped locomotives
Standard gauge locomotives of the United States
Passenger locomotives